When Robots Go Bad is the third studio album released by Hexstatic. The album features vocals from Ema J, female MC B+, Sabirajade and MC Profisee from Scottish group Scotland Yard MCs and Great Ezcape.

Track listing
"Red Laser Beam" (3:28)
"Roll Over" (feat. Sabirajade) (5:06)
"Tokyo Traffic" (4:20)
"Freak Me" (feat. B+) (3:55)
"Prom Night Party" (Hexstatic Remix) (4:11)
"Tlc" (4:19)
"Move On" (feat. Ema J & Profisee) (3:59)
"A Different Place" (feat. B+) (3:56)
"Subway" (feat. Profisee)  (3:23)
"Lab Rat Interlude" (2:48)
"Newton’s Cradle" (3:48)
"Newaves" (3:08)
"Bust" (3:46)

Hexstatic albums
2007 albums
Ninja Tune albums